Omaha Central High School, originally known as Omaha High School, is a fully accredited public high school located in downtown Omaha, Nebraska, United States. It is one of many public high schools located in Omaha. As of the 2015-16 academic year, Omaha Central had an enrollment of 2,552 students.

The current building, located in Downtown Omaha, was designed by John Latenser, Sr. and was built between 1900 and 1912. It is the oldest active high school building in the city.

History 

On November 10, 1859, Omaha Central High School began as Omaha High School in the Nebraska Territory capitol building. In 1869, after the territorial government was removed from Omaha, the capitol building was donated to the City of Omaha by the Nebraska state government for educational use only. In 1870, it was demolished. In 1872, it was replaced by a four-story building that hosted kindergarten through twelfth grades. In 1900, a new building was begun that encircled the second school, which was dismantled by 1912. Kindergarten through eighth grade were moved to the neighboring Central Elementary School. A gym was added to Central in 1930, and this building is still in use today.

Extracurricular activities

Athletics
The Eagles compete in Class A, the largest classification in Nebraska according to the Nebraska School Activities Association. Throughout its history, Omaha Central has won numerous state championships in various sports. Many graduates have gone on to participate in collegiate athletics. The football and soccer teams compete at Seeman Stadium located on campus. The boys' and girls' basketball games and volleyball matches are played at the Central High gymnasium. The baseball and softball teams compete at Boyd Stadium, a renovated park three miles northeast of the campus.

In 2007, the Eagles became the only high school in Nebraska to have won championships in three main sports in the same calendar year. As a result, Central was ranked by Sports Illustrated as one of the top 10 high-school athletic programs in the country.

State championships

Newspaper and media
The high school's newspaper is  The Register. In 1986 Quill and Scroll officially declared The Register the oldest continuously published newspaper west of the Mississippi.

After running a controversial story in 2001, the staff and the paper were rebuked by the administration. The story reported on a football player continuing to play, despite two assault charges. The charges, as stated in the school's handbook, should have led to a dismissal from the team. After running the story, the paper was threatened with being shut down. The school advisor received support from media outlets on the local and national level. This support stopped the paper from being shut down.

The staff of Central's student newspaper, were awarded the Student Press Review's Edmund J. Sullivan Award in 2002 after they wrote a series of articles exposing several controversial topics throughout the school. After the administration again threatened the paper with closure, the students won reprieve through the support of professional journalists across the country.

Central has had youth-led media for some years. Starting in 1923, it had a high school radio station for five years. First, KFCZ operated during the 1923–1924 school year. In 1925 the call letters changed to KOCH, and the Central High School Radio Club presented shows throughout the school day and special events on the weekends. The station was ordered discontinued by the Federal Communications Commission in 1928, as they devalued the purpose of school-affiliated radio stations and rescinded their licenses across the United States.

Central also had, starting in 1969, a student-run radio station, KIOS-FM (91.5 MHz), which operated during the 1969–1973 school years. In 1973 the radio station was moved to Benson High School, and later to the old Tech High location, where it is still in operation.

KIOS-FM (91.5 MHz) is a National Public Radio member station in Omaha, owned and operated by Omaha Public Schools.

JROTC
The Military Science program at Omaha Central High School predates the JROTC program.  It began in the 1892–1893 school year.  It became the most popular activity at the school.  Initially, all male students were required to participate.

Notable alumni

Arts
 Erin Belieu, National Poetry Series winning poet; editor; founder of VIDA: Women in Literary Arts
 Henry Fonda, Academy Award-winning actor
 Terry Goodkind, author
 Aaron Marcus, Princeton University graduate, computer graphics designer
 Zahn McClarnon, actor
 Dorothy McGuire, Academy Award-nominated actress
 Jay Milder, expressionist painter
 Dan Mirvish (1985), American filmmaker 
 Tillie Olsen, writer and activist
 Inga Swenson, actress
 Joan Micklin Silver, film director

Business
 Susan Alice Buffett, daughter of Warren Buffett; philanthropist
 Susan Thompson Buffett, mother of Susie Buffett, former wife of Warren Buffett; former president of the Buffett Foundation
 Peter Kiewit, founder of the Kiewit Corporation, one of the world's largest construction companies
 Charlie T. Munger, billionaire investor and Warren Buffett partner
 Gerry Thomas, inventor of the TV dinner in 1952

Military and politics
 Brenda Council, long-time North Omaha city councilwoman
 James W. Fous, Vietnam War veteran; recipient of the Medal of Honor award
 Peter Hoagland, politician who represented the 2nd Congressional District of Nebraska in the United States House of Representatives
 Jarvis Offutt, American World War I aviator, namesake of Offutt Air Force Base
 Seth Rich, employee of Democratic National Committee murdered in 2016
 William Marshall Roark, US Navy lieutenant killed in Vietnam; namesake of the USS Roark
 Robert F. Schoultz (1942), US Navy aviator and vice admiral
 Kenneth C. Stephan, justice of the Nebraska Supreme Court
 Edward Zorinsky, Omaha mayor and Nebraska senator

Music
 Peter Buffett, son of Susan and Warren Buffett; musician
 Wynonie Harris, rhythm & blues singer with 15 top 10 hits

Sciences
 Alan J. Heeger, 2000 Nobel Prize winner in Chemistry
 John L. Holland, psychologist who developed The Holland Codes
 Lawrence R. Klein, 1980 Nobel Prize winner in Economic Science
 Saul A. Kripke, philosopher and Princeton University professor
 Gerald Weinberg, computer scientist and prolific author

Sports
 Kimera Bartee, Major League Baseball player (Detroit Tigers, Cincinnati Reds, Colorado Rockies)
 Jason Brilz, mixed martial arts fighter
 Dwaine Dillard, professional basketball player
 Ahman Green, football player
 Harland Gunn, National Football League player
 Tra-Deon Hollins, NBA G League player
 Calvin Jones, football player
 Keith Jones, football player
 Joe Orduna, National Football League player
 Jed Ortmeyer, National Hockey League player
 Shaun Prater, National Football League player
 Chris Reed, National Football League player
 Bobby Robertson, football player
 Hunter Sallis, basketball player for the Gonzaga Bulldogs, former McDonald's All-American
 Gale Sayers, Pro Football Hall of Fame running back depicted in the movie Brian's Song
 Larry Station, National Football League player
 Tre'Shawn Thurman, NBA G League player
 Pat Venditte, Major League Baseball player
 Brandon Williams, National Football League player

Former principals
The list of principals of Omaha High School/Central dates from 1870 to present.
 John Kellom, 1870–1875
 W. H. Merritt, 1875–1877
 C. H. Crawford, 1877–1881
 Charles Hine, 1881–1882
 Homer Lewis, 1882–1896
 Irwen Leviston, 1896–1899
 A. H. Waterhouse, 1899–1908
 E. U. Graff, 1908–1911
 Kate McHugh, 1911–1914
 Clayton Reed, 1914–1915
 Joseph G. Masters, 1915–1939
 Fred Hill, 1939–1944
 J. Arthur Nelson, 1944–1968
 Gaylord “Doc” Moller, 1968–1995
 Gary L. Thompson, 1995–2002
 Jerry F. Bexten, 2002–2006
 Gregory Emmel, 2006–2010
 Keith Bigsby, 2010-2013
 Ed Bennett, 2013-2021
 Dionne Kirksey, 2021-

See also
Omaha Public Schools

References

External links

 Omaha Central High School home page
 Central High School Foundation 
 Central High School - class reunion websites at Classreport.org
 Historical photo of the school (see upper right-hand corner)
 http://www.nsaahome.org/so.php

Omaha Public Schools
High schools in Omaha, Nebraska
History of Downtown Omaha, Nebraska
Educational institutions established in 1912
National Register of Historic Places in Omaha, Nebraska
Omaha Landmarks
Nebraska Territory
John Latenser Sr. buildings
Public high schools in Nebraska
School buildings on the National Register of Historic Places in Nebraska
1912 establishments in Nebraska
International Baccalaureate schools in Nebraska